Thomas Van den Keybus (born 25 April 2001) is a Belgian professional footballer who plays as a winger for Belgian First Division A club Westerlo, on loan from Club Brugge.

Club career

Club Brugge
Van den Keybus made his professional debut with Club Brugge II in a 2–0 Belgian First Division B loss to RWDM47 on 22 August 2020. The following week, Club Brugge announced that they had extended Van den Keybus' contract through 2023. A month after his professional debut, on 27 September 2020, he also made his debut for the first team of Club Brugge in a league match against Cercle Brugge, where he came on as a substitute for Ruud Vormer four minutes before time. On 4 February 2022, Club announced that they had extended their contract with Van den Keybus for a second time, this time through 2025.

Westerlo (loan)
On 13 August 2021, Van den Keybus joined Westerlo on a season-long loan. Van den Keybus debuted for Westerlo on 15 August 2021, during a 2–0 victory over Virton. On 4 February 2022, the same day that Van den Keybus extended his contract with Club, it was announced that his loan at Westerlo would be extended through the 2022-23 season.

Honors

Westerlo

 Belgian First Division B: 2021–22

References

External links
 
 Club Brugge Profile
  ACFF Profile

2001 births
Footballers from Bruges
Living people
Belgian footballers
Belgium youth international footballers
Association football wingers
Club Brugge KV players
Club NXT players
K.V.C. Westerlo players
Belgian Pro League players
Challenger Pro League players